Hardy Nathaniel Goff (July 9, 1910 – July 2, 1978),
was a businessman from Alexandria, Louisiana, who served as a Democrat from 1952 to 1956 in the Louisiana House of Representatives during the administration of Governor Robert F. Kennon. His colleagues were his fellow Alexandria Democrats Cecil R. Blair and Lloyd George Teekell.

Goff owned an insurance agency in Alexandria. A subdivision is also named for him. Goff died a week before his 68th birthday and is interred at Alexandria Memorial Gardens.

References

1910 births
1978 deaths
Democratic Party members of the Louisiana House of Representatives
Politicians from Alexandria, Louisiana
Businesspeople from Louisiana
Insurance agents
20th-century American businesspeople
20th-century American politicians
Burials in Louisiana